Taypi Qullu (Aymara taypi center, middle, qullu mountain, "center mountain", Hispanicized spelling Taypi Kkollu) is a mountain in the Andes of Bolivia which reaches a height of approximately . It is located in the Oruro Department, Sajama Province, Turco Municipality. Taypi Qullu lies southwest of Jach'a Apachita.

References 

Mountains of Oruro Department